Margaretta Forten (September 11, 1806 – January 13, 1875) was an African-American suffragist and abolitionist.

Biography 
Margaretta Forten was born in Philadelphia, Pennsylvania, on September 11, 1806. Her parents, Charlotte Vandine Forten and James Forten, were abolitionists, and her father founded the American Moral Reform Society.

Due to the exclusion of women from the American Anti-Slavery Society, Forten, with her mother Charlotte and  sisters Sarah and Harriet, co-founded the Philadelphia Female Anti-Slavery Society with ten other women in 1833. The goal of this new society was to include women in the activism being done for the abolition of slavery, and  "to elevate the people of color from their present degraded situation to the full enjoyment of their rights and to increased usefulness in society." (Brown, 145)  Forten often served as recording secretary or treasurer of the Society, as well as helping to draw up its organizational charter and serving on its educational committee. She offered the Society's last resolution, which praised the post-civil war amendments as a success for the anti-slavery cause. The Society distinguished itself at the time as the first of its kind in the United States to be interracial. Although the Society was predominantly white, historian Janice Sumler-Lewis claims the efforts of the Forten women in its key offices enabled it to reflect a black abolitionist perspective that oftentimes was more militant.

Forten toured and gave speeches in favor of women's suffrage, as well as helping petition drives for the cause.  She also worked as a teacher, teaching at a school run by Sarah Mapps Douglass in the 1840s, and opening her own school in 1850.

Later life and death 
Having never married, Forten returned to her childhood home in Philadelphia following the death of her father. She continued to reside there until her death at the age of 68 in Philadelphia on January 14, 1875. She is buried at the Saint James the Less Episcopal Churchyard Cemetery in Philadelphia.

See also
 List of abolitionists
 List of African-American abolitionists

References

American suffragists
African-American abolitionists
African-American activists
Schoolteachers from Pennsylvania
19th-century American women educators
1806 births
1875 deaths
Forten family
African-American suffragists
19th-century American educators
Women civil rights activists
Burials at the Church of St. James the Less